Maurizio Cocciolone (born 22 September 1960 in L'Aquila, Abruzzo, Italy) is an Italian Air Force officer, who served with UN Coalition forces and was a prisoner of war during the Gulf War.

He was born in L'Aquila, Abruzzo. On the eve of the Operation Desert Storm the Italian government deployed eight Tornado Fighter-bombers on the Gulf Theatre of Operations.

On January 16, 1991, coalition forces began concentrated air strikes on Iraqi military targets in Iraq and Kuwait.

On January 18, 1991, an Italian Tornado, piloted by Major Gianmarco Bellini, with Captain Maurizio Cocciolone as his navigator, took off as part of a multi national 48 planes squadron. Bellini and Cocciolone were the only members of the squadron able to execute in-flight refueling, while the other 47 aircraft failed and had to abort. The mission profile dictated that the operation could be performed even by a single plane, so Bellini and Cocciolone went on.

Their plane was hit by Iraqi anti aircraft fire and they had to eject. They were captured by Iraqi ground troops, even though their status was unknown at the time.

On January 20, 1991, Cocciolone was shown on Iraqi television as part of a propaganda effort by his Iraqi captors. First the voice interviews, followed by the videotapes, were released by CNN. Cocciolone appeared to be speaking under extreme duress, and his face showed signs of physical abuse. No news of Bellini was given initially, and he was feared to be a casualty. The two were kept separate for the whole time of their captivity.

Released by Iraq on March 3, 1991, Bellini and Cocciolone were the only Italian POW's captured during the entire war.

External links
 Cocciolone's entry in the Homecoming project
  Gianmarco Bellini recounts his history

1960 births
Living people
People from L'Aquila
Italian Air Force personnel
Italian aviators
Gulf War prisoners of war
Military personnel of the Gulf War
Italian prisoners of war
Italian torture victims
Shot-down aviators
Prisoners of war held by Iraq